Phí Minh Long (born 11 February 1995) is a Vietnamese footballer who plays as a goalkeeper for V.League 2 club Quảng Nam.

SEA Games 2017
Minh Long was included in U22 Vietnam squad for the 2017 Southeast Asian Games.

On August 24, in the final match of group stage against U22 Thailand, he handled the ball with his hands in the penalty area after a pass from teammate. Due to this mistake, U22 Thailand got an indirect free kick, and Phitiwat Sukjitthammakul scored the opening goal. Later, he made another mistake, jumping off the ground and kicked his defender straight into the face, which led to Thailand's second goal. Vietnam eventually lost 0-3 and was eliminated. He was heavily criticized by the media and since then has never gotten a chance to play for the national team at any level.

Honours

Club

Hà Nội
V.League 1: 2016, 2018, 2019; Runner-up: 2015, 2020  
Vietnamese National Cup: 2019, 2020; Runner-up: 2015, 2016
Vietnamese Super Cup: 2019, 2020, 2021; Runner-up: 2016, 2017

External links

References

1995 births
Living people
Vietnamese footballers
Vietnam international footballers
V.League 1 players
Hanoi FC players
Sportspeople from Hanoi
Association football goalkeepers
Southeast Asian Games bronze medalists for Vietnam
Southeast Asian Games medalists in football
Competitors at the 2015 Southeast Asian Games
Competitors at the 2017 Southeast Asian Games
21st-century Vietnamese people